The Flüela Wisshorn is a mountain of the Silvretta Alps, overlooking the Flüela Pass in the Swiss canton of Graubünden.

Access roads
The climbing route starts from the road which leads to the Fluela pass (2383 m). You can get there by following an attractive road from Davos in the north-west or from Susch in the east.

The normal route to the summit
You can start walking directly from the pass or from the parking at 2207 m above the sea level below the pass in the direction of Davos. 
This is a simple walk in the north-east direction towards the Winterlucke pass which is at 2787 m. From there the summit is clearly visible, just follow the rocky ridge.

References

External links
 Flüela Wisshorn on Hikr
 Flüela Wisshorn on Mountains for Everybody.

Mountains of the Alps
Alpine three-thousanders
Mountains of Switzerland
Mountains of Graubünden
Silvretta Alps
Davos
Klosters-Serneus
Zernez